Son-Rise is a home-based program for children and adults with autism spectrum disorders and other developmental disabilities, which was developed by Barry Neil Kaufman and Samahria Lyte Kaufman for their son Raun, who was diagnosed with autism and is claimed to have fully recovered from his condition. The program is described by Autism Speaks as a "child-centered program that places parents as the key therapists and directors of their program."

Parents are trained at the Kaufman's Autism Treatment Center of America (ATCA) - the division of The Option Institute in Sheffield, Massachusetts that teaches The Son-Rise Program. There, the Kaufman family and their fellow staff members teach families and professionals how to be aware of their attitudes—a core principle of the therapy—for bonding and relationship building, as well as creating a low-stimulus, distraction-free playroom or a room of attention environment so the autistic person (child or adult) can feel secure and in control of the over-stimulation. Parents and facilitators join in an autistic person's exclusive and restricted stimming behavior until the autistic person shows social cues for willing engagement. Then encouragement for more complex social activities is done in a non-coercive way. If the autistic person moves away from social interaction, the facilitator gives the autistic person their space by using parallel play in order to gain the child's or the adult's trust. To encourage skill acquisition, the program uses the autistic person's particular motivation for learning.

The program's developers claim if the parents learn to accept their loved one without judgement that they will teach themselves to interact with others, and that this will allow them to engage in social interaction because they chose to learn the skills. A 2003 study found that involvement with the program led to more drawbacks than benefits for the involved families over time, though there was a strong correlation between patterns of intervention implementation and parental perceptions of intervention efficacy. A 2006 study found that the program is not always implemented as it is described in the literature, which means it will be difficult to evaluate its success and failure rate.

History

In the 1970s, Barry and Samahria Kaufman created the treatment modality for their son, Raun, who had been diagnosed with severe autism. However, it remains unclear if Raun Kaufman had ever been autistic. Of the five clinics who evaluated the boy in New York State—each describing him as "socially withdrawn and uncommunicative," it was only the sixth clinic that felt he was autistic.

In 1976, Barry Neil Kaufman published Son-Rise, a book recounting his son's claimed recovery, which he self published in 1995 with the title Son-Rise: The Miracle Continues. The book was adapted into a televised docudrama film, called Son-Rise: A Miracle of Love and aired on NBC in 1979.

Today, Raun Kaufman is the Director of Global Education for the Autism Treatment Center of America. A 1997 BBC documentary followed the family of a five-year-old autistic boy treated by the program.

Effectiveness

There are no documented normalizations with older children, and it may be that success "depends on a certain level of intellectual potential". Some professionals have questioned the emphasis placed on eye contact and its potential problems for some children. The consensus within the medical community is that there is no cure for autism and only a very few treatments have empirical evidence for improvements in symptoms.
A 2003 study found that involvement with the Son-Rise Program led to more drawbacks than benefits for the involved families over time, although family stress levels did not rise in all cases. A 2006 study found that the Son-Rise Program is not always implemented as it is typically described in the literature, which suggests it will be difficult to evaluate its efficacy.

In 2009, United Kingdom’s Advertising Standards Authority sanctioned the Option Institute for a misleading ad claiming Son-Rise as an autism cure. As of 2017, there was little evidence supporting the program.

References

External links
Autism Treatment Center of America

Autism-related organizations in the United States